John Purves (born February 12, 1968) is a Canadian former professional ice hockey player who played seven games in the National Hockey League for the Washington Capitals during the 1990–91 NHL season.

Early life
Born in Toronto, Ontario, Purves played junior hockey in the Ontario Hockey League before joining the Capitals organization in 1989.

Career 
Purves was selected by the Capitals, 103rd overall, in the 1986 NHL Entry Draft. He mostly played in the American Hockey League for the Baltimore Skipjacks but managed to play seven regular season games for Washington during the 1990–91 season, scoring one goal.

After playing in the Eishockey-Bundesliga in Germany for ESV Kaufbeuren, Purves spent the next eight seasons in the International Hockey League, remaining in the league until its closure in 2001. He played for the Fort Wayne Komets, San Francisco Spiders, Kansas City Blades, San Antonio Dragons and the Utah Grizzlies.

After the IHL's demise, Purves followed Utah to the AHL who were one of six IHL teams to join the league for the 2001–02 AHL season. In 2002, he moved to the United Kingdom and signed for the Nottingham Panthers of the Ice Hockey Superleague in his final season before retiring.

Career statistics

References

 

1968 births
Living people
Baltimore Skipjacks players
Belleville Bulls players
Canadian ice hockey forwards
Fort Wayne Komets players
Hamilton Steelhawks players
Kansas City Blades players
ESV Kaufbeuren players
Niagara Falls Thunder players
North Bay Centennials players
Nottingham Panthers players
San Antonio Dragons players
San Francisco Spiders players
Ice hockey people from Toronto
Utah Grizzlies (AHL) players
Utah Grizzlies (IHL) players
Washington Capitals draft picks
Washington Capitals players